Twin Peaks: The Missing Pieces is a 2014 feature-length compilation of deleted and extended scenes from Twin Peaks: Fire Walk with Me, a 1992 film directed by David Lynch and written by Lynch and Robert Engels. It was released over twenty-two years after the movie and the original series ended, and three years before the revival, Twin Peaks: The Return, aired.

Several scenes from Fire Walk with Me—a film that serves as a prequel to the television series Twin Peaks (1990–1991), created by Mark Frost and Lynch—were left unused in order to keep the film at a two-hour and fifteen minute running time. The Missing Pieces comprises the unused footage from Fire Walk with Me, piecing together the deleted scenes to make a feature-length film.

Twin Peaks: The Missing Pieces features the cast of Fire Walk with Me, including Sheryl Lee, Moira Kelly, David Bowie, Chris Isaak, Harry Dean Stanton, Ray Wise, Kyle MacLachlan, and Mädchen Amick. Due to the expanded content, The Missing Pieces expands upon the fictional investigation into the murder of Teresa Banks (Pamela Gidley), as well as the last seven days in the life of Laura Palmer (Sheryl Lee), a popular high school student in the fictional Washington town of Twin Peaks.

The Missing Pieces also includes scenes that feature characters from the television series that were excluded from Fire Walk with Me, such as Josie Packard (Joan Chen), Ed Hurley (Everett McGill), and Nadine Hurley (Wendy Robie).

Summary
Late at night, after performing the autopsy on the body of Teresa Banks, FBI Agents Sam Stanley and Chet Desmond discuss how much time had passed since they entered the morgue. They visit Hap's Diner, where Teresa once worked the night shift as a waitress, and question the diner's owner about Teresa. When the FBI seeks to move Teresa's body from the town of Deer Meadow to Portland, Sheriff Cable of Deer Meadow engages in a fight with Desmond and loses. Later, Special Agent Dale Cooper is shown in a doorway in the Philadelphia headquarters of the FBI talking to his secretary Diane. Next, Cooper meets Sam Stanley after Desmond went missing.

Agent Phillip Jeffries is shown checking into a hotel in Argentina. Jeffries is then seen vanishing when entering an elevator. He emerges from a different elevator several years later on the other side of the world and discusses the things that he saw in-between worlds. Later, the Black Lodge spirits, the Man from Another Place and Killer Bob, are shown residing above a convenience store.

One year later in Twin Peaks, Bobby Briggs and Mike Nelson discuss the fact that they owe Leo Johnson $5,000 and that their cocaine supply is running low. After going to school, Laura Palmer is horrified when she discovers pages ripped out of her diary. As she runs downstairs, she bumps into her mother, Sarah Palmer, who is returning from grocery shopping. Laura asks to use the car, claiming she forgot her books.

Later, the Palmer family is having dinner when Leland Palmer attempts to teach his family how to introduce themselves and say their names in Norwegian, as Benjamin Horne is having a delegation of Norwegians arriving in a week and Leland wants his family to be able to introduce themselves properly. The family end up laughing together.

One night, Laura sneaks out of her house and meets a trucker in his truck and exchanges sex for drugs. Later, Laura is shown at the Double R Diner preparing to make the Meals on Wheels deliveries. Ed Hurley and Nadine Hurley enter the diner for coffee. When Nadine sees Norma Jennings working at the counter, she angrily makes Ed leave with her. When Shelly Johnson sees Laura staring at the place where Mrs. Tremond and her grandson were standing, Laura tells her that she cannot make the deliveries and runs off. Norma tells Shelly to do Laura's route. Norma begins to cry in a booth. Ed reenters the diner and apologizes.

Dale Cooper, trapped in the Black Lodge/Red Room, is shown talking to the Man from Another Place. When Laura discovers that BOB is her father, she runs crying to her best friend Donna Hayward's house.

At the Packard Saw Mill, Dell Mibbler complains to Josie Packard and Pete Martell that their two-by-fours are not exactly two inches by four inches. This causes Josie to become anxious and Pete to become irritated, who tells him that at Dell's bank the dollar is not worth the same as it used to be, which causes Dell to apologize.

Laura Palmer goes up the stairs and begins to hear the voice of BOB, coming from the ceiling fan. She slowly begins to become possessed by BOB, only to have her mother Sarah interrupt the possession. Sarah begins to have a nervous breakdown and Laura attempts to comfort her. Leo is later shown verbally and physically abusing his wife Shelly, and forces her to clean the kitchen floor.

One night, Laura and Donna go with two strangers that the former met at the Roadhouse, as they drive drunk and high on cocaine across the Canadian border to a night club. Teresa Banks pieces together information about her client who backed out earlier, and realizes it was Laura's father. She calls him in an attempt to blackmail him. Sheriff Harry S. Truman and his deputies, Andy and Hawk meet to discuss catching a local drug dealer.

After Bobby killed a crooked cop the night before, he meets Laura at her locker at school and asks her to hide $10,000 in her safety deposit box. Laura antagonizes Bobby about the situation, which makes him angry. Bobby goes into the woods and discovers that the drugs he almost got killed over were nothing but baby laxatives. Dr. Lawrence Jacoby calls Laura and questions why she has not called or visited him recently. Laura shows disgust in her facial expression and says that she made audio tapes for him.

On the night of her death, Laura is having dinner with her mother, fully aware that her father is BOB. Feeling disgusted with her father and herself, she asks if she can go to Bobby's house. Major Briggs reads aloud from the Book of Revelation to his wife Betty. Lucy, Andy and Truman are shown at the Sheriff's Station. Later that night, Laura climbs out her bedroom window to meet James Hurley, one last time, she hides in the bushes outside her house as her father approaches the front door. Leland sees her, and follows her. The Log Lady is shown clenching her log as she hears the screams of Laura's murder.

Two scenes take place after the end of the original television series. The first scene depicts Annie Blackburn being wheeled into the hospital after her encounter with Dale Cooper in the Black Lodge. She is wearing the ring Laura Palmer and Teresa Banks wore before their deaths until a nurse steals the ring off her finger. In the next scene, Dr. Hayward and Sheriff Truman hear Cooper/Bob smash his head against the mirror. The doppelgänger, still cackling "How's Annie?", hears them and lies on the floor. Dr. Hayward says that Cooper should go right back to bed. The doppelganger replies, "But I haven't brushed my teeth yet."

Cast

Production

Several scenes from Twin Peaks: Fire Walk with Me had to be cut from the final product to keep the movie at a two-hour and fifteen minute running time. This film comprises the unused footage from Fire Walk with Me.  Lynch pieced together all of the deleted scenes to make a feature-length film. This film shows a closer look into investigation into the murder of Teresa Banks and expands on the last seven days in the life of Laura Palmer, a popular high school student in the fictional Washington town of Twin Peaks, and has scenes that feature characters from the television series that had their scenes deleted from the final version of Fire Walk with Me. The production companies for the film are Absurda and MK2 Diffusion. The film was distributed by CBS/Fox Home Video and MK2 Diffusion.

The shooting script features several additional scenes that were never shot, including a conversation between Pete Martell and Big Ed Hurley at Big Ed's Gas Farm, a lunchtime picnic at which Sheriff Truman serenades Josie Packard and discusses why he would never eat fish eyes, and a rendezvous between Laura Palmer and Ben Horne at Johnny Horne's birthday party. This last scene was dropped due to actor Richard Beymer's reluctance to play it, because of the intimacy implied between his character and the 17-year-old Laura Palmer, as well as the fact that in the scene, Ben supplies Laura with cocaine.

Release
The Missing Pieces premiered on July 16, 2014, in Los Angeles' Vista Theatre before being released as a part of Twin Peaks: The Entire Mystery on Blu-ray.

Critical reception
Jace Lacob noted how The Missing Pieces is not a typical "film" but is rather a collection of different moments that each  capture a variety of emotions stating:

He then goes on to say that while the film does not solve any of the mysteries surrounding Twin Peaks, it offers a different perspective for the intentions that Lynch had for Fire Walk with Me and gives a greater appreciation for Sheryl Lee's performance as Laura, noting:

References

External links
 

Twin Peaks
2014 films
2014 horror films
2010s avant-garde and experimental films
2010s mystery films
2014 psychological thriller films
American avant-garde and experimental films
American horror thriller films
American mystery films
Films scored by Angelo Badalamenti
Films based on television series
Films directed by David Lynch
Films set in 1988
Films set in 1989
Films set in Philadelphia
Films set in Washington (state)
Films shot in Washington (state)
Incest in film
Films with screenplays by David Lynch
American psychological horror films
2010s English-language films
2010s American films